Hannover-Anderten-Misburg is a railway station located in Anderten and Misburg-Nord, Hannover, Germany. The station is located on the Hanover–Brunswick railway. The train services are operated by Deutsche Bahn as part of the Hanover S-Bahn. Hannover-Anderten-Misburg is served by the S3 and S7. It is in Zone 2 of Hannover.

Train services
The following services currently call at Hannover-Anderten-Misburg:

External link

Anderten-Misburg
Hannover S-Bahn stations